Electoral District of East Toowoomba was an electoral district of the Legislative Assembly in the Australian state of Queensland. It was created in 1912 when the old seat of Drayton & Toowoomba split into East Toowoomba,  Toowoomba and Drayton. East Toowoomba ceased to exist in 1950.

In the 1960 redistribution, a seat of Toowoomba East (along with Toowoomba West) was created that lasted until 1972.

When East Toowoomba was lost to redistribution, Sir Gordon Chalk contested the seat of Lockyer successfully.

Members for East Toowoomba

Election results

See also
 Electoral districts of Queensland
 Members of the Queensland Legislative Assembly by year
 :Category:Members of the Queensland Legislative Assembly by name

References

Darling Downs
Toowoomba
East Toowomba
Constituencies established in 1912
Constituencies disestablished in 1950
1912 establishments in Australia
1950 disestablishments in Australia